The term Himalayan states is used to group countries that straddle the Himalayas. It primarily denotes Bhutan, China, India, Nepal, and Pakistan; some definitions also include Afghanistan and Myanmar. Two countries—Bhutan and Nepal—are located almost entirely within the mountain range, which also covers southern Tibet, the Indian Himalayan Region, and northern Pakistan.

The inhabitants of this region are mostly speakers of the Indo-Aryan languages and the Tibeto-Burman languages.

Some of the world's major transboundary rivers originate in the territory of the Himalayan states, including the Brahmaputra, the Ganges, the Indus, and the Irrawaddy.

See also 
 Alpine states
 Andean states
 Baltic states

References

External links 
 Top ten longest mountain ranges (land-based)

States
Geography of Nepal
Geography of Tibet
Geography of Pakistan
Geography of India
Geography of China
Geography of Bhutan
Regions of Asia
Regions of Eurasia
Countries